Little Italy–University Circle (signed as Mayfield Road, Little Italy–University Circle) is a station on the RTA Red Line in the University Circle neighborhood of Cleveland, Ohio. It is located at the Mayfield Road (U.S. Route 322) and East 119 Street intersection, near the western end of Little Italy.

History

Construction began in October 2013 and reuses an old vault under the railroad bridges as the lobby area. The vault was built in the 1920s as a potential commuter rail station by the Van Sweringen brothers and was composed of passenger tunnels and stairways. As part of the construction, a new headhouse, entrance plaza, and platform were built, an elevator installed, and two transit track bridges were rehabilitated. In addition, multiple pieces of public art were installed in the station and new concrete sidewalks, landscaping, and lighting were added as well as repairs made to the bridge abutment.

The station opened on August 11, 2015, making it the first new station on the Red Line since 1969 when Brookpark station opened.

Station layout

Notable places nearby
 Little Italy
 Case Western Reserve University (northern campus)
 University Hospitals Case Medical Center
 Cozad–Bates House
 Museum of Contemporary Art Cleveland
 Holy Rosary Church
 Cleveland Feast of the Assumption Festival
 Alta Public Library
 Mayfield Cemetery
 Lake View Cemetery

References

Red Line (RTA Rapid Transit)
Railway stations in the United States opened in 2015
University Circle
2015 establishments in Ohio